Unlicensed developers and fans have created unofficial Mario media, especially video games, relating to the Mario franchise. These products include video games, ROM hacks, and animations. Due to the popularity of the franchise, some of these unlicensed products have received critical attention.

In September 2016, Nintendo issued over 500 DMCA takedown requests on diverse websites for various fan games based on Nintendo intellectual properties, resulting in the end of many infringing games' development.

Video games

Console games
Several unofficial Mario games have been released for video game consoles, including unlicensed games, ROM hacks, and game mods.

 Super Mario World, an unlicensed Nintendo NES/Famicom demake of Super Mario World, developed by Hummer Team and published by J.Y. Company (both defunct Taiwanese companies based in Taipei) in 1995.
 Kaizo Mario World, also known as Asshole Mario, is a series of three ROM hacks of the 1990 Super Nintendo Entertainment System video game Super Mario World, notable for deliberately breaking normal rules of "accepted" level design and featuring extreme difficulty. It became the namesake for Kaizo, a genre of Mario games modified for intense difficulty.
 Super Dram World is series of two Super Mario World ROM hacks created by PangaeaPanga and named after speedrunner Dram55, designed for high difficulty.
Super Panga World is a ROM hack of Super Mario World created by Linkdeadx2 and dedicated to PangaeaPanga.
 , released in English as Big TV Mary Bar and also known as Mario Lottery, TV Mario, is an unlicensed video game for the Family Computer made by Bit Corporation and released by Fiver Firm (五合企業有限公司), under their first name "Namco Corporation". It is based on the Taiwanese slot machine game Xiǎo Mǎ Lì, where features a character resembling Mario with an F on his cap, which has become known as "Fortran" based on hidden text discovered in the ROM. The game is a roulette wheel/slot machine – different buttons control the betting, and each button produces a musical note. Landing on the coin produces a message in Chinglish: "PUSH START TO RICH". It became an internet meme when users created fad videos on YouTube.
7 Grand Dad, also known as Primitive Mario VII, is a bootleg ROM hack of The Flintstones: Rescue of Dino and Hoppy in which Fred Flintstone's head is replaced with that of Mario. The bootleg is notorious for its nonsensical title, as well as its lack of effort in removing Flintstones elements such as the characters and theme song. The game has become an internet meme due to Twitch streamer Joel "Vargskelethor" Johannson's shocked reaction to it and YouTuber SiIvaGunner's remixes of the game's soundtrack.
Kart Fighter is a 2D fighting game produced for the Nintendo Entertainment System. The game features unauthorized appearances by Nintendo's mascot Mario and the rest of the cast of Super Mario Kart in a port of Street Fighter II.
Somari is a port of Sega's flagship video game Sonic the Hedgehog, produced for the Nintendo Entertainment System and sold primarily in Asia, Russia, and other regions where pirate Famicom cartridges were distributed, in 1994. The game features a character named "Somari" – Mario wearing Tails' shoes.
Super Mario Bros. 2 is a pirated port of Super Mario Bros. for the Mega Drive, made by Gametec in 1998. The game uses sprites from Super Mario All-Stars and uses the engine of another pirated game from another console, called "Chip & Dale", and it's about thowing boxes to the enemies.
Project M is a modification of the 2008 fighting game Super Smash Bros. Brawl for the Wii, created by the community to retool Brawl to play more like its two predecessors, Super Smash Bros. and Super Smash Bros. Melee.
Newer Super Mario Bros. Wii is a modification of New Super Mario Bros. Wii, which adds new, custom elements to the original game. It later received a follow-up on the Nintendo DS, a modification of New Super Mario Bros., Newer Super Mario Bros. DS, and a follow-up mod for New Super Mario Bros. U called Newer Super Mario Bros. U was started but later cancelled. There is an updated version of Newer Super Mario Bros. Wii in the works, titled Newer Super Mario Bros. Wii Plus. 
Kaizo Mario 64 is a ROM hack of Super Mario 64 where each level is redesigned to be extremely difficult.
 Modder Kaze Emanuar has produced multiple ROM hacks of Super Mario 64:
, converting the game into a 2.5D running game in the spirit of Super Mario Run;
, enabling online multiplayer;
, a Mario Maker-like level editor;
, featuring levels based on Super Mario Odyssey while also adding its mechanic of possessing enemies by throwing Mario's hat;
, featuring all levels from Donkey Kong 64;
, an original game with new levels made using Super Mario 64s engine;
, in which The Legend of Zelda: Ocarina of Time world is recreated in Super Mario 64s engine, with new gameplay elements, puzzles and story;
, a battle royale-style mod set on a huge map made up of all Super Mario 64 levels, in the style of Fortnite Battle Royale and PlayerUnknown's Battlegrounds.
 is a ROM hack of the 1999 Nintendo 64 fighting game Super Smash Bros. It retains the gameplay style of the original release while adding new gameplay modes, stages, and characters; these include characters from later Super Smash Bros. games such as Ganondorf Bowser, and Sonic the Hedgehog, and new characters such as Conker the Squirrel and the Mad Piano from Super Mario 64.

Level editors
There exist several unofficial level editors created to allow gamers without programming skills to easily make their own ROM hacks or levels in Mario games.
Super Mario Bros. X is a fangame blending elements from Super Mario Bros, 2, 3 and World, and includes both a level editor, as well simultaneous split-screen multiplayer.
Lunar Magic is a level editor for Super Mario World.
NSMB Editor is a level editor for New Super Mario Bros.
Reggie! Level Editor is a level editor for New Super Mario Bros. Wii.
Miyamoto! Level Editor is a level editor for New Super Mario Bros. U and New Super Luigi U, similar to Reggie!.
CoinKiller is a level editor for New Super Mario Bros. 2.
Super Mario ReMaker is a Windows-based level editor designed to replicate the Wii U title Super Mario Maker on computers.
Toad's Tool 64 is a level editor for Super Mario 64 developed by Qubed Studios.

Computer games
Unofficial Mario games playable on computers include mostly browser-based games, game parodies, and fangames sometimes inserting the character or world of Mario in the engine or style of other projects.
 Syobon Action, also referred to as Cat Mario, a Mario parody known for its difficulty and troll levels.
 Ennuigi is a browser game designed by Josh Millard that centers on Luigi's inability to come to terms with the lack of narrative in Super Mario Bros.
  is a Flash game based on Super Mario World, featuring former United States president Barack Obama as the protagonist against enemies such as lobbyists, Sarah Palin, and pigs wearing lipstick.
  is a sidescrolling platformer mashup of Super Mario Bros. and Tetris. As the visible screen automatically scrolls to the right, the player moves to the right while avoiding obstacles. The player can switch between moving the player-character Mario and dropping tetrominos that Mario can use as platforms. The game has traditional Mario enemies. The Flash game is freely available via Newgrounds. Chris Donlan of Edge wrote that the game showed signs of hasty development. Its gameplay was occasionally inelegant as a result. Jenni Lada of TechnologyTell particularly appreciated how she could build a staircase to the flagpole at the end of the level.
 Super Mario War is fan-made battle-based Mario platformer. The game has been ported to a number of platforms, including an unofficial port to the Nintendo Wii.
 , a 2019 browser game in which dozens of players simultaneously attempt to outrun each other in battle royale-style gameplay. After receiving a takedown notice, its creator InfernoPlus edited the game to use non-Nintendo assets as DMCA Royale. Later on, after a second takedown, there have been several instances of the game being rehosted by different people, as there currently are two available versions of the game: MRoyale and Mario Royale Deluxe, which are independent of each other.
 Mari0 is a fan game that combines elements of Portal and Super Mario Bros.
 Super Mario Bros. Crossover is a flash game that puts various video game characters into Super Mario Bros. levels.
 Super Smash Bros. Crusade is a Super Smash Bros. fan game featuring over 60 characters and 24 stages.
 Super Smash Flash is a series of non-profit, fighting, crossover, fan-made Flash games based on the Super Smash Bros. series.
 Secret Maryo Chronicles is a free, open source two-dimensional platform game.
 Super Smash Land is a demake of Super Smash Bros. featuring six playable characters and eleven stages. The game visual design resembles the graphics from the Nintendo Game Boy.
 No Mario's Sky is an indie game that crosses over between the gameplay of No Man's Sky and Super Mario Bros. Due to a Digital Millennium Copyright Act notice filed by Nintendo, the game was re-released as DMCA's Sky with all in-game references to Super Mario Bros. removed.
 Mario Kart: Source was a planned total conversion mod in development using the Source game engine developed by Valve. It was first announced in 2006 with development suspending in November 2012 due to difficulties in making a fun racing game with the engine. It is based on the Mario Kart series.
 Kill the Plumber is a platform game parody of Super Mario Bros. Players control the inhabitants of a kingdom invaded by a plumber and must stop him before he can reach a princess.
 Trumptendo is a website created by artist Jeff Hong, featuring hacked versions of various Nintendo Entertainment System games (including Super Mario Bros.) that replace characters with Donald Trump and other United States political figures.
Super Mario 64 HD is an unofficial remake of the first level of Super Mario 64 using the Unity game engine.
Super Mario 63 is a 2D Flash game, mostly inspired by Super Mario 64 and Super Mario 64 DS but also taking inspiration from other Mario games like Super Mario Sunshine and Super Mario Galaxy.
Super Mario Flash is an unofficial 2-dimensional Adobe Flash-based game based on Super Mario Bros. that was developed by Pouetpu and was originally released in 2007. In this single-player platform game, one can play as either Mario or Luigi, and in the game one must embark on a journey to save Princess Peach from Bowser. The game also has a built-in level editor. Gameranx praised Super Mario Flash as #4 in its "Top Five Retro Arcade Games Freely Available" article, stating that "the creator of this game has put a lot of effort into making this game as close to the original as possible." MegaLab, an Italian review website, however, gave a more negative response to Super Mario Flash, criticizing the game's controls and visual quality. In 2011, Pouetpu released a sequel called Super Mario Flash 2, which is based on Super Mario World.
 Full Screen Mario is a browser game containing all 32 Super Mario Bros. levels, a level editor, and a level generator.
Super Chick Sisters is a 2007 PETA satirical browser game that spoofs New Super Mario Bros. and Super Mario Galaxy.
New Super Chick Sisters is a 2009 PETA satirical browser game that spoofs New Super Mario Bros. Wii.
Mario Kills Tanooki is a 2011 PETA satirical browser game that spoofs Super Mario 3D Land.
The Super 1–1 Challenge is a 2020 fan-made remake of the first level of Super Mario Bros. recreated as a first person shooter.

Videos

 Super Hornio Brothers and Super Hornio Brothers II are two 1993 pornographic parodies of the Super Mario franchise, they were released at the same time as the official Super Mario Bros. film. Both films star Buck Adams, T. T. Boy, Ron Jeremy and Chelsea Lynx as the main characters. Nintendo bought the rights to the films to halt their distribution.
 Super Mario Clouds (2002), Totally Fucked (2003), and Super Mario Movie (2005), are videos created by post-conceptual artist Cory Arcangel by modifying Super Mario Brothers NES cartridges. These works have been presented in multiple museums.
 Super Mario Bros. Z (2006–2012; 2016–present) – An online crossover sprite animated series using Adobe Flash created by Mark Haynes. Super Mario Bros. Z stars characters from Mario and Sonic the Hedgehog (see List of unofficial Sonic media) franchise and features dynamic, fast-paced movement as well as story elements in the style of Dragon Ball Z. The series was later remade between 2015 and 2016, before Nintendo took down the series' Patreon account. Four years later, however, the first episode of the rebooted series was re-uploaded to YouTube, as work on the series resumed.
 Stupid Mario Brothers (2007–2012; 2014–2017) – A YouTube live-action series created by Richard Michael Alvarez portraying the Mario brothers escaping the Mushroom Kingdom for time in the Real World. Initially the series started off as mainly comedy but got progressively story driven and gained a more serious tone by mid Season 2. A tie-in movie was made in 2009. The main story of the series ended in 2012 but a spinoff, the Plumber Knight, resumed the story with "Stupid Mario World" being a continuation of the main story ultimately ending with another movie in 2017, "Stupid Mario Brothers Legacy". The series features character appearances from many other franchises as well such as Metal Gear, Pokémon, The Legend of Zelda, Mother, Street Fighter, and Final Fantasy.
 Mario: Game Over (2007) – A short-film created by POYKPAC. The video depicts Mario's life after breaking up with Princess Peach. The video was nominated for "Best Comedy Video" in the 2008 YouTube Awards, but lost to Potter Puppet Pals.
 Mario Kart (2008) – A viral video by prankster Rémi Gaillard, which depicts him driving a go-cart through public streets while dressed as Mario. He later did a similar prank in 2011.
 Mario Kart: The Movie (2009) – A fan-made trailer created by DrCoolSex that was loosely based on the Mario Kart series.
 Real Life Mario Kart (2011) – A viral video by filmmaker Freddie Wong.
 SMG4 (2011–present) – A web animated series by Australian Garry's Mod filmmaker Luke Lerdwichagul. It is usually a parody of several pop-cultural cliches. The channel of SMG4 was created in 2009 by Luke Lerdwichagul when he was a teenager, primarily creating comedic videos of Super Mario 64 on a low budget by interspersing clips of the game and editing them via Windows Movie Maker. The characters include characters from the Mario series, Nintendo and non-Nintendo characters and original characters. Right now the series has spawned 13 Seasons, 7 story arcs, many spin-offs and 758 episodes (base series only).
 Racist Mario (2014) – A flash-animated short on YouTube that was created by Flashgitz. The video depicts Mario violently eliminating his opponents in Mario Kart. There are also characters from non-Nintendo-and-Sega games such as God of War's Kratos and LittleBigPlanet's Sackboy.

Fandom
In the late 2000s, YouTube Poop meme videos arose using cutscenes from various Mario-related sources, including the Philips CD-i game Hotel Mario and Super Mario World episode, "Mama Luigi". "Mama Luigi" was later re-animated by 227 animators in 2017 in dedication to the deaths of two of the series' voice actors: Tony Rosato (Luigi) and Harvey Atkin (King Koopa). There was also another meme featuring Luigi that was popular in the community called "Weegee," which was the character's sprite from the MS-DOS version of Mario is Missing. The meme was officially referenced in the North American release of Super Smash Bros. for Wii U where it refers to Luigi's taunts in his trophy description as, "100% Weegee."

After the release of Mario Kart 8 in 2014, a short clip featuring "Luigi's Death Stare" went viral; the original clip featured Luigi passing other drivers with an uncharacteristically angry facial pose set to the music of Chamillionaire's 2006 hit song Ridin'. The meme was referenced by Nintendo itself during their E3 2014 presentation.

In September 2018, a fanmade character called Bowsette became popular and had hundreds of artists producing fanart. Bowsette is a depiction of Bowser using Toadette's Super Crown power-up from New Super Mario Bros. U Deluxe to transform himself into a Princess Peach lookalike.

References

Unauthorized video games
Mario unofficial media
Mario unofficial media